The Yushan-class landing platform dock is a class of landing platform dock built by CSBC Corporation, Taiwan for the Republic of China Navy (ROCN). Four ships are planned, with one ship launched in April 2021.

Description

The ships are able to carry several AAV7 amphibious APCs along with 673 troops. The ships also has a single flight deck with two hangars able to accommodate Sikorsky UH-60 Black Hawk or the naval Sikorsky SH-60 Seahawk helicopters.

The class is unusually well armed for a landing platform dock with a 76 mm gun, two Phalanx CIWS, and two modular missile launchers of either 8 Hsiung Feng II surface-to-surface missiles or 16 Hai Chien surface-to-air missiles. They also have radar signature reducing features and electromagnetic pulse protection.

The lead ship of the class cost $4.635 billion NTD ($163 million USD).

The class is intended to fill both military and humanitarian roles, as a command ship for amphibious operations, a mothership for the ROCN's small minelayers, and a general logistics transport capable of supplying islands without harbor facilities.

History

The Yushan class is intended to maintain the inventory of the ROCN's land platform docks at two ships.  The lead ship of the class will fill the void left by the retirement of the ROCS Chung Cheng (formerly USS Comstock), while a planned second ship will replace the ROCS Hsu Hai (formerly USS Pensacola), which served in the Republic of China Navy since 1999.

Design efforts began in early 2015 and were unveiled on 15 May 2016. The keel of the lead vessel was laid in June 2020. Yushan was launched in April 2021, the launch ceremony was attended by President Tsai Ing-wen and Defense Minister Chiu Kuo-cheng. President Tsai described the vessel as a “milestone” on Taiwan’s journey to naval shipbuilding self-sufficiency.

The first ship of the class, Yushan, began her sea trials on 7 July 2022. The ship was delivered on 30 September 2022 by CSBC Corporation, Taiwan.

Ships of class

See also
 Panshih-class fast combat support ship

References

Amphibious warfare vessel classes
Amphibious warfare vessels of the Republic of China Navy
Ships built in the Republic of China